John Horton Conway  (26 December 1937 – 11 April 2020) was an English mathematician active in the theory of finite groups, knot theory, number theory, combinatorial game theory and coding theory. He also made contributions to many branches of recreational mathematics, most notably the invention of the cellular automaton called the Game of Life.

Born and raised in Liverpool, Conway spent the first half of his career at the University of Cambridge before moving to the United States, where he held the John von Neumann Professorship at Princeton University for the rest of his career. On 11 April 2020, at age 82, he died of complications from COVID-19.

Early life and education
Conway was born on 26 December 1937 in Liverpool, the son of Cyril Horton Conway and Agnes Boyce. He became interested in mathematics at a very early age. By the time he was 11, his ambition was to become a mathematician. After leaving sixth form, he studied mathematics at Gonville and Caius College, Cambridge. A "terribly introverted adolescent" in school, he took his admission to Cambridge as an opportunity to transform himself into an extrovert, a change which would later earn him the nickname of "the world's most charismatic mathematician".

Conway was awarded a BA in 1959 and, supervised by Harold Davenport, began to undertake research in number theory. Having solved the open problem posed by Davenport on writing numbers as the sums of fifth powers, Conway began to become interested in infinite ordinals. It appears that his interest in games began during his years studying the Cambridge Mathematical Tripos, where he became an avid backgammon player, spending hours playing the game in the common room. 

In 1964, Conway was awarded his doctorate and was appointed as College Fellow and Lecturer in Mathematics at Sidney Sussex College, Cambridge. 

After leaving Cambridge in 1986, he took up the appointment to the John von Neumann Chair of Mathematics at Princeton University. There, he won the school's Pi Day pie-eating contest.

Conway and Martin Gardner
Conway's career was intertwined with that of Martin Gardner. When Gardner featured Conway's Game of Life in his Mathematical Games column in October 1970, it became the most widely read of all his columns and made Conway an instant celebrity.<ref>Mulcahy, Colm (21 October 2014) Martin Gardner, puzzle master extraordinaire, BBC News Magazine: "The Game of Life appeared in Scientific American in 1970, and was by far the most successful of Gardner's columns, in terms of reader response."</ref> Gardner and Conway had first corresponded in the late 1950s, and over the years Gardner had frequently written about recreational aspects of Conway's work. For instance, he discussed Conway's game of Sprouts (July 1967), Hackenbush (January 1972), and his angel and devil problem (February 1974). In the September 1976 column, he reviewed Conway's book On Numbers and Games and even managed to explain Conway's surreal numbers.

Conway was a prominent member of Martin Gardner's Mathematical Grapevine. He regularly visited Gardner and often wrote him long letters summarizing his recreational research. In a 1976 visit, Gardner kept him for a week, pumping him for information on the Penrose tilings which had just been announced. Conway had discovered many (if not most) of the major properties of the tilings. Gardner used these results when he introduced the world to Penrose tiles in his January 1977 column. The cover of that issue of Scientific American features the Penrose tiles and is based on a sketch by Conway.

Personal life and death
Conway was married three times. With his first two wives he had two sons and four daughters. He married Diana in 2001 and had another son in 2001. He had three grandchildren and two great-grandchildren.

On 8 April 2020, Conway developed symptoms of COVID-19. On 11 April, he died in New Brunswick, New Jersey, at the age of 82.

Major areas of research

Recreational mathematics

Conway invented the Game of Life, one of the early examples of a cellular automaton. His initial experiments in that field were done with pen and paper, long before personal computers existed. Since Conway's game was popularized by Martin Gardner in Scientific American in 1970, it has spawned hundreds of computer programs, web sites, and articles. It is a staple of recreational mathematics. There is an extensive wiki devoted to curating and cataloging the various aspects of the game. From the earliest days, it has been a favorite in computer labs, both for its theoretical interest and as a practical exercise in programming and data display. Conway came to dislike the Game of Life, feeling that it overshadowed deeper and more important things he had done. Nevertheless, the game helped to launch a new branch of mathematics, the field of cellular automata.
The Game of Life is known to be Turing complete.

Combinatorial game theory
Conway contributed to combinatorial game theory (CGT), a theory of partisan games. He developed the theory with Elwyn Berlekamp and Richard Guy, and also co-authored the book Winning Ways for your Mathematical Plays with them. He also wrote On Numbers and Games (ONAG) which lays out the mathematical foundations of CGT.

He was also one of the inventors of the game sprouts, as well as philosopher's football. He developed detailed analyses of many other games and puzzles, such as the Soma cube, peg solitaire, and Conway's soldiers. He came up with the angel problem, which was solved in 2006.

He invented a new system of numbers, the surreal numbers, which are closely related to certain games and have been the subject of a mathematical novelette by Donald Knuth. He also invented a nomenclature for exceedingly large numbers, the Conway chained arrow notation. Much of this is discussed in the 0th part of ONAG.

Geometry
In the mid-1960s with Michael Guy, Conway established that there are sixty-four convex uniform polychora excluding two infinite sets of prismatic forms. They discovered the grand antiprism in the process, the only non-Wythoffian uniform polychoron. Conway has also suggested a system of notation dedicated to describing polyhedra called Conway polyhedron notation.

In the theory of tessellations, he devised the Conway criterion which is a fast way to identify many prototiles that tile the plane.

He investigated lattices in higher dimensions and was the first to determine the symmetry group of the Leech lattice.

Geometric topology
In knot theory, Conway formulated a new variation of the Alexander polynomial and produced a new invariant now called the Conway polynomial. After lying dormant for more than a decade, this concept became central to work in the 1980s on the novel knot polynomials. Conway further developed tangle theory and invented a system of notation for tabulating knots, now known as Conway notation, while correcting a number of errors in the 19th-century knot tables and extending them to include all but four of the non-alternating primes with 11 crossings. The Conway knot is named after him.

Conway's conjecture that, in any thrackle, the number of edges is at most equal to the number of vertices, is still open.

Group theory
He was the primary author of the ATLAS of Finite Groups giving properties of many finite simple groups. Working with his colleagues Robert Curtis and Simon P. Norton he constructed the first concrete representations of some of the sporadic groups. More specifically, he discovered three sporadic groups based on the symmetry of the Leech lattice, which have been designated the Conway groups. This work made him a key player in the successful classification of the finite simple groups.

Based on a 1978 observation by mathematician John McKay, Conway and Norton formulated the complex of conjectures known as monstrous moonshine. This subject, named by Conway, relates the monster group with elliptic modular functions, thus bridging two previously distinct areas of mathematics—finite groups and complex function theory. Monstrous moonshine theory has now been revealed to also have deep connections to string theory.

Conway introduced the Mathieu groupoid, an extension of the Mathieu group M12 to 13 points.

Number theory
As a graduate student, he proved one case of a conjecture by Edward Waring, that every integer could be written as the sum of 37 numbers each raised to the fifth power, though Chen Jingrun solved the problem independently before Conway's work could be published.

Algebra
Conway wrote a textbook on Stephen Kleene's theory of state machines and published original work on algebraic structures, focusing particularly on quaternions and octonions.  Together with Neil Sloane, he invented the icosians.

Analysis
He invented a base 13 function as a counterexample to the converse of the intermediate value theorem: the function takes on every real value in each interval on the real line, so it has a Darboux property but is not continuous.

Algorithmics
For calculating the day of the week, he invented the Doomsday algorithm. The algorithm is simple enough for anyone with basic arithmetic ability to do the calculations mentally. Conway could usually give the correct answer in under two seconds. To improve his speed, he practised his calendrical calculations on his computer, which was programmed to quiz him with random dates every time he logged on. One of his early books was on finite-state machines.

Theoretical physics
In 2004, Conway and Simon B. Kochen, another Princeton mathematician, proved the free will theorem, a version of the "no hidden variables" principle of quantum mechanics. It states that given certain conditions, if an experimenter can freely decide what quantities to measure in a particular experiment, then elementary particles must be free to choose their spins to make the measurements consistent with physical law. Conway said that "if experimenters have free will, then so do elementary particles."

Awards and honours
Conway received the Berwick Prize (1971), was elected a Fellow of the Royal Society (1981), became a fellow of the American Academy of Arts and Sciences in 1992, was the first recipient of the Pólya Prize (LMS) (1987), won the Nemmers Prize in Mathematics (1998) and received the Leroy P. Steele Prize for Mathematical Exposition (2000) of the American Mathematical Society. In 2001 he was awarded an honorary degree from the University of Liverpool, and in 2014 one from Alexandru Ioan Cuza University.
His FRS nomination, in 1981, reads: 

In 2017 Conway was given honorary membership of the British Mathematical Association.

Conferences called Gathering 4 Gardner are held every two years to celebrate the legacy of Martin Gardner, and Conway himself was often a featured speaker at these events, discussing various aspects of recreational mathematics.Bellos, Alex (2008). The science of fun. The Guardian, 30 May 2008

Select publications

 1971 – Regular algebra and finite machines. Chapman and Hall, London, 1971, Series: Chapman and Hall mathematics series, .
 1976 – On numbers and games. Academic Press, New York, 1976, Series: L.M.S. monographs, 6, .
 1979 – On the Distribution of Values of Angles Determined by Coplanar Points (with Paul Erdős, Michael Guy, and H. T. Croft). Journal of the London Mathematical Society, vol. II, series 19, pp. 137–143.
 1979 – Monstrous Moonshine (with Simon P. Norton). Bulletin of the London Mathematical Society, vol. 11, issue 2, pp. 308–339.
 1982 – Winning Ways for your Mathematical Plays (with Richard K. Guy and Elwyn Berlekamp). Academic Press, .
 1985 – Atlas of finite groups (with Robert Turner Curtis, Simon Phillips Norton, Richard A. Parker, and Robert Arnott Wilson). Clarendon Press, New York, Oxford University Press, 1985, .
 1988 – Sphere Packings, Lattices, and Groups (with Neil Sloane). Springer-Verlag, New York, Series: Grundlehren der mathematischen Wissenschaften, 290, .
 1995 – Minimal-Energy Clusters of Hard Spheres (with Neil Sloane, R. H. Hardin, and Tom Duff). Discrete & Computational Geometry, vol. 14, no. 3, pp. 237–259.
 1996 – The Book of Numbers (with Richard K. Guy). Copernicus, New York, 1996, .
 1997 – The Sensual (quadratic) Form (with Francis Yein Chei Fung). Mathematical Association of America, Washington, DC, 1997, Series: Carus mathematical monographs, no. 26, .
 2002 – On Quaternions and Octonions (with Derek A. Smith). A. K. Peters, Natick, MA, 2002, .
 2008 – The Symmetries of Things (with Heidi Burgiel and Chaim Goodman-Strauss). A. K. Peters, Wellesley, MA, 2008, .

See also
 List of things named after John Horton Conway

References

Sources
 Alpert, Mark (1999). Not Just Fun and Games Scientific American, April 1999
 Boden, Margaret (2006). Mind As Machine, Oxford University Press, 2006, p. 1271
 du Sautoy, Marcus (2008). Symmetry, HarperCollins, p. 308
 Guy, Richard K (1983). Conway's Prime Producing Machine Mathematics Magazine, Vol. 56, No. 1 (Jan. 1983), pp. 26–33
 
 
 
 Princeton University (2009). Bibliography of John H. Conway Mathematics Department
 Seife, Charles (1994). Impressions of Conway'' The Sciences
 Schleicher, Dierk (2011), Interview with John Conway, Notices of the AMS

External links

 
 
 
 
 
  Conway leading a tour of brickwork patterns in Princeton, lecturing on the ordinals and on sums of powers and the Bernoulli numbers
necrology by Keith Hartnett in Quanta Magazine, April 20, 2020

 
1937 births
2020 deaths
20th-century  English  mathematicians
21st-century  English  mathematicians
Algebraists
Group theorists
Combinatorial game theorists
Cellular automatists
Mathematics popularizers
Recreational mathematicians
Alumni of Gonville and Caius College, Cambridge
Fellows of Sidney Sussex College, Cambridge
Fellows of the Royal Society
Princeton University faculty
Scientists from Liverpool
British expatriate academics in the United States
Researchers of artificial life
Deaths from the COVID-19 pandemic in New Jersey